Lionel Chee (born 4 August 1931) is a Singaporean water polo player. He competed in the men's tournament at the 1956 Summer Olympics.

He was given the honour of carrying the national flag of Singapore at the opening ceremony of the 1956 Summer Olympics in Melbourne, becoming the eighth water polo player to be a flag bearer at the opening and closing ceremonies of the Olympics.

References

External links
 

1931 births
Living people
Singaporean male water polo players
Olympic water polo players of Singapore
Water polo players at the 1956 Summer Olympics
Place of birth missing (living people)
Asian Games medalists in swimming
Asian Games medalists in water polo
Asian Games gold medalists for Singapore
Asian Games silver medalists for Singapore
Asian Games bronze medalists for Singapore
Swimmers at the 1951 Asian Games
Swimmers at the 1954 Asian Games
Water polo players at the 1951 Asian Games
Water polo players at the 1958 Asian Games
Water polo players at the 1962 Asian Games
Medalists at the 1951 Asian Games
Medalists at the 1954 Asian Games
Medalists at the 1958 Asian Games
Medalists at the 1962 Asian Games
20th-century Singaporean people